Xiomara Blandino (born September 10, 1984) is a Nicaraguan architecture student who held the title of Miss Nicaragua 2007. She participated in the Miss Universe 2007 contest representing Nicaragua and made it to the semifinals. She placed 10th overall where Miss Japan Riyo Mori went on to win the title.

References

1984 births
Miss Universe 2007 contestants
People from Managua
Living people
Nicaraguan beauty pageant winners